The Synagogue Church is a small Christian church in the heart of Nazareth known by this name due to a tradition claiming that it the location where the village synagogue stood in Jesus' time.  Above its doorway is an embedded sign in Arabic and English: "Synagogue".

The structure is administered by the Melkite Greek Catholic Church.

History
In 570, an Italian visitor described Nazareth's synagogue, and reported that the original Bible was still there, including the bench where Jesus used to sit.

The floor of the Synagogue Church is sunken about 1.5 meters underground, possibly built atop a Crusader church dating from the 12th century.

The church was under the control of the Franciscans until the 18th century, when the ruler Zahir al-Umar passed it to the Greek Catholics. 
In 1887, the Melkite Greek Catholic parish church of the Annunciation was built adjacent to the Synagogue Church.

Christian tradition
According to Christian tradition, the church is built on the ruins of the ancient Nazareth synagogue where Jesus studied and prayed. In addition, it is where one Sabbath day Jesus went to preach. In two Gospels, his fellow townspeople became angry with him. Because he was one of them, they did not trust him to have the authority to preach in that way and to perform miracles. He was amazed at their lack of faith and concluded that a prophet is not honoured in his own home town.

But he tells them that prophets are called to do their work in foreign places rather than at home, because they are not accepted in their own home town. In doing this, he also implicitly declares himself as the Messiah. This sermon infuriates the listeners, who drag him to a cliff to throw him over, but he simply walks through the crowd and leaves.

Significance
Little is known of the years Jesus spent in Nazareth, leading scholars to describe this time as "the hidden life" or "the silent years". It is thus all the more significant for Christian visitors to find a lone place where such silence is broken – the Synagogue Church.

See also
Greek Catholic Church of Nazareth
Melkite Greek Catholic Archeparchy of Akka
Catholic Church in Israel

References

External links 
 Visitor information for the Synagogue Church

Churches in Nazareth
Nazareth Synagogue